The 2016 East–West Shrine Game was the 91st staging of the all-star college football exhibition, was played on January 23, 2016 at 4:00 PM EST, and featured NCAA Division I Football Bowl Subdivision players and a few select invitees from Canadian university football. The game featured more than 100 players from the 2015 NCAA Division I FBS football season and prospects for the 2016 Draft of the professional National Football League (NFL). In the week prior to the game, scouts from all 32 NFL teams attended. The game was held in St. Petersburg, Florida at Tropicana Field, and benefits Shriners Hospitals for Children. The game was broadcast on the NFL Network.

The East–West Shrine Game Pat Tillman Award "is presented to a player who best exemplifies character, intelligence, sportsmanship and service. The award is about a student-athlete's achievements and conduct, both on and off the field." The 2016 winner was Keenan Reynolds of Navy.

Players
Full roster is available here.

East Team

Offense

Defense

Specialists

West Team

Offense

Defense

Specialists

Game summary

Scoring summary

Statistics

See also
2016 NFL Draft

References

2015–16 NCAA football bowl games
2016
American football in Florida
Sports competitions in St. Petersburg, Florida
January 2016 sports events in the United States
2016 in sports in Florida